Henry Alfred Kissinger  (born Heinz Alfred Kissinger, May 27, 1923) is a German-born American diplomat, geopolitical consultant, and politician who served as United States Secretary of State and National Security Advisor under the presidential administrations of Richard Nixon and Gerald Ford. For his actions negotiating a ceasefire in Vietnam, Kissinger received the 1973 Nobel Peace Prize under controversial circumstances.  
 
Kissinger was a Jewish refugee who fled Nazi Germany with his family in 1938. Upon arriving to the United States, he excelled academically and graduated from Harvard College in 1950, where he studied under William Yandell Elliott. He earned his MA and PhD degrees at Harvard University in 1951 and 1954, respectively. 

A practitioner of Realpolitik, Kissinger played a prominent role in United States foreign policy between 1969 and 1977, pioneering the policy of détente with the Soviet Union, orchestrating an opening of relations with the People's Republic of China, engaging in what became known as shuttle diplomacy in the Middle East to end the Yom Kippur War, and negotiating the Paris Peace Accords, which ended American involvement in the Vietnam War. Kissinger has also been associated with such controversial policies as U.S. involvement in the 1973 Chilean military coup, a "green light" to Argentina's military junta for their Dirty War, and U.S. support for Pakistan during the Bangladesh Liberation War despite a genocide being perpetrated by Pakistan. After leaving government, he formed Kissinger Associates, an international geopolitical consulting firm. Kissinger has written over a dozen books on diplomatic history and international relations.

Kissinger remains a controversial and polarizing figure in U.S. politics, both venerated by some as a highly effective U.S. Secretary of State and condemned by others for allegedly tolerating or supporting war crimes committed by allied nation states during his tenure. A 2015 survey of top international relations scholars, conducted by College of William & Mary, ranked Kissinger as the most effective U.S. secretary of state in the 50 years to 2015. With the death of centenarian George Shultz in February 2021, Kissinger is the oldest living former U.S. Cabinet member and the last surviving member of Nixon's Cabinet.

Early life and education
Kissinger was born Heinz Alfred Kissinger on May 27, 1923, in Fürth, Bavaria, Germany, the son of homemaker Paula (née Stern; 1901–1998, from Leutershausen), and Louis Kissinger (1887–1982), a schoolteacher. He had a younger brother, businessman Walter (1924–2021). His family was German Jewish. The surname Kissinger was adopted in 1817 by his great-great-grandfather Meyer Löb, after the Bavarian spa town of Bad Kissingen. In his youth, Kissinger enjoyed playing soccer. He played for the youth team of SpVgg Fürth, which was one of the nation's best clubs at the time. In a 2022 interview, he vividly recalled being nine years old in 1933 and learning of Adolf Hitler's election as Chancellor of Germany, which proved to be a profound turning point for the Kissinger family.

In 1938, when Kissinger was 15 years old, he and his family fled Germany as a result of Nazi persecution. During Nazi rule, Kissinger and his friends were regularly harassed and beaten by Hitler Youth gangs. Kissinger sometimes defied the segregation imposed by Nazi racial laws by sneaking into soccer stadiums to watch matches, often resulting in beatings from security guards. As a result of the Nazis' anti-Semitic laws Kissinger was unable to gain admittance to the Gymnasium, while his father was dismissed from his teaching job. The family briefly emigrated to London before arriving in New York City on September 5. Kissinger later downplayed the influence his experiences of Nazi persecution had on his policies, writing "Germany of my youth had a great deal of order and very little justice; it was not the sort of place likely to inspire devotion to order in the abstract." However, many scholars, including Kissinger's biographer Walter Isaacson, have disagreed and argued that his experiences influenced the formation of his realist approach to foreign policy.

Kissinger spent his high school years in the Washington Heights section of Upper Manhattan as part of the German Jewish immigrant community that resided there at the time. Although Kissinger assimilated quickly into American culture, he never lost his pronounced German accent, due to childhood shyness that made him hesitant to speak.  After his first year at George Washington High School, he began attending school at night and worked in a shaving brush factory during the day.

Following high school, Kissinger enrolled in the City College of New York, studying accounting. He excelled academically as a part-time student, continuing to work while enrolled. His studies were interrupted in early 1943, when he was drafted into the U.S. Army.

Army experience
Kissinger underwent basic training at Camp Croft in Spartanburg, South Carolina. On June 19, 1943, while stationed in South Carolina, at the age of 20 years, he became a naturalized U.S. citizen. The army sent him to study engineering at Lafayette College, Pennsylvania, but the program was canceled, and Kissinger was reassigned to the 84th Infantry Division. There, he made the acquaintance of Fritz Kraemer, a fellow immigrant from Germany who noted Kissinger's fluency in German and his intellect, and arranged for him to be assigned to the military intelligence section of the division. Kissinger saw combat with the division, and volunteered for hazardous intelligence duties during the Battle of the Bulge.

During the American advance into Germany, Kissinger, only a private, was put in charge of the administration of the city of Krefeld, owing to a lack of German speakers on the division's intelligence staff. Within eight days he had established a civilian administration. Kissinger was then reassigned to the Counter Intelligence Corps (CIC), where he became a CIC Special Agent holding the enlisted rank of sergeant. He was given charge of a team in Hanover assigned to tracking down Gestapo officers and other saboteurs, for which he was awarded the Bronze Star. In June 1945, Kissinger was made commandant of the Bensheim metro CIC detachment, Bergstrasse district of Hesse, with responsibility for denazification of the district. Although he possessed absolute authority and powers of arrest, Kissinger took care to avoid abuses against the local population by his command.

In 1946, Kissinger was reassigned to teach at the European Command Intelligence School at Camp King and, as a civilian employee following his separation from the army, continued to serve in this role.

Kissinger would later recall that his experience in the army "made me feel like an American".

Academic career

Kissinger received his BA degree summa cum laude, Phi Beta Kappa in political science from Harvard College in 1950, where he lived in Adams House and studied under William Yandell Elliott. His senior undergraduate thesis, titled The Meaning of History: Reflections on Spengler, Toynbee and Kant, was over 400 pages long, and was the origin of the current limit on length (35,000 words). He received his MA and PhD degrees at Harvard University in 1951 and 1954, respectively. In 1952, while still a graduate student at Harvard, he served as a consultant to the director of the Psychological Strategy Board, and founded a magazine, Confluence. At that time, he sought to work as a spy for the FBI.

His doctoral dissertation was titled Peace, Legitimacy, and the Equilibrium (A Study of the Statesmanship of Castlereagh and Metternich). In his PhD dissertation, Kissinger first introduced the concept of "legitimacy", which he defined as: "Legitimacy as used here should not be confused with justice. It means no more than an international agreement about the nature of workable arrangements and about the permissible aims and methods of foreign policy". An international order accepted by all of the major powers is "legitimate" whereas an international order not accepted by one or more of the great powers is "revolutionary" and hence dangerous. Thus, when after the Congress of Vienna in 1815, the leaders of Britain, France, Austria, Prussia, and Russia agreed to co-operate in the Concert of Europe to preserve the peace after Austria, Prussia, and Russia participated in a series of three Partitions of Poland, in Kissinger's viewpoint this international system was "legitimate" because it was accepted by the leaders of all five of the Great Powers of Europe. Notably, Kissinger's primat der aussenpolitik approach to diplomacy took it for granted that as long as the decision-makers in the major states were willing to accept the international order, then it is "legitimate" with questions of public opinion and morality dismissed as irrelevant.

Kissinger remained at Harvard as a member of the faculty in the Department of Government where he served as the director of the Harvard International Seminar between 1951 and 1971. In 1955, he was a consultant to the National Security Council's Operations Coordinating Board. During 1955 and 1956, he was also study director in nuclear weapons and foreign policy at the Council on Foreign Relations. He released his book Nuclear Weapons and Foreign Policy the following year. The book, which criticized the Eisenhower Administration's "massive retaliation" nuclear doctrine, caused much controversy at the time by proposing the use of tactical nuclear weapons on a regular basis to win wars. That same year, he published A World Restored, a study of balance-of-power politics in post-Napoleonic Europe.

From 1956 to 1958, Kissinger worked for the Rockefeller Brothers Fund as director of its Special Studies Project. He served as the director of the Harvard Defense Studies Program between 1958 and 1971. In 1958, he also co-founded the Center for International Affairs with Robert R. Bowie where he served as its associate director. Outside of academia, he served as a consultant to several government agencies and think tanks, including the Operations Research Office, the Arms Control and Disarmament Agency, Department of State, and the RAND Corporation.

Keen to have a greater influence on U.S. foreign policy, Kissinger became foreign policy advisor to the presidential campaigns of Nelson Rockefeller, supporting his bids for the Republican nomination in 1960, 1964, and 1968. Kissinger first met Richard Nixon at a party hosted by Clare Boothe Luce in 1967, saying that he found him more "thoughtful" than he expected. During the Republican primaries in 1968, Kissinger again served as the foreign policy adviser to Rockefeller and in July 1968 called Nixon "the most dangerous of all the men running to have as president". Initially upset when Nixon won the Republican nomination, the ambitious Kissinger soon changed his mind about Nixon and contacted a Nixon campaign aide, Richard Allen, to state he was willing to do anything to help Nixon win. After Nixon became president in January 1969, Kissinger was appointed as National Security Advisor. By this time he was arguably "one of the most important theorists about foreign policy ever to be produced by the United States of America", according to his official biographer Niall Ferguson.

Foreign policy 

Kissinger served as National Security Advisor and Secretary of State under President Richard Nixon, and continued as Secretary of State under Nixon's successor Gerald Ford. With the death of George Shultz in February 2021, Kissinger is the last surviving member of the Nixon administration Cabinet.

The relationship between Nixon and Kissinger was unusually close, and has been compared to the relationships of Woodrow Wilson and Colonel House, or Franklin D. Roosevelt and Harry Hopkins. In all three cases, the State Department was relegated to a backseat role in developing foreign policy. Kissinger and Nixon shared a penchant for secrecy and conducted numerous "backchannel" negotiations, such as that through the Soviet Ambassador to the United States, Anatoly Dobrynin, that excluded State Department experts. Historian David Rothkopf has looked at the personalities of Nixon and Kissinger, saying:
They were a fascinating pair. In a way, they complemented each other perfectly. Kissinger was the charming and worldly Mr. Outside who provided the grace and intellectual-establishment respectability that Nixon lacked, disdained and aspired to. Kissinger was an international citizen. Nixon very much a classic American. Kissinger had a worldview and a facility for adjusting it to meet the times, Nixon had pragmatism and a strategic vision that provided the foundations for their policies. Kissinger would, of course, say that he was not political like Nixon—but in fact he was just as political as Nixon, just as calculating, just as relentlessly ambitious ... these self-made men were driven as much by their need for approval and their neuroses as by their strengths.

A proponent of Realpolitik, Kissinger played a dominant role in United States foreign policy between 1969 and 1977. In that period, he extended the policy of détente. This policy led to a significant relaxation in US–Soviet tensions and played a crucial role in 1971 talks with Chinese Premier Zhou Enlai. The talks concluded with a rapprochement between the United States and China, and the formation of a new strategic anti-Soviet Sino-American alignment. He was jointly awarded the 1973 Nobel Peace Prize with Lê Đức Thọ for helping to establish a ceasefire and U.S. withdrawal from Vietnam. The ceasefire, however, was not durable. Thọ declined to accept the award and Kissinger appeared deeply ambivalent about it - he donated his prize money to charity, did not attend the award ceremony, and later offered to return his prize medal.[40] As National Security Advisor in 1974, Kissinger directed the much-debated National Security Study Memorandum 200.

Détente and opening to China

Kissinger initially had little interest in China when he began his work as National Security Adviser in 1969, and the driving force behind the rapprochement with China was Nixon. In April 1970 both Nixon and Kissinger promised Chiang Ching-kuo, a leader in Taiwan, that they would never abandon Taiwan or make any compromises with Mao Zedong, although Nixon did speak vaguely of his wish to improve relations with the People's Republic.

Kissinger made two trips to China in July and October 1971 (the first of which was made in secret) to confer with Premier Zhou Enlai, then in charge of Chinese foreign policy. During his visit to Beijing, the main issue turned out to be Taiwan, as Zhou demanded the United States recognize that Taiwan was a legitimate part of China, pull U.S. forces out of Taiwan, and end military support for the Kuomintang regime. Kissinger gave way by promising to pull U.S. forces out of Taiwan, saying two-thirds would be pulled out when the Vietnam war ended and the rest to be pulled out as Sino-American relations improved.

In October 1971, as Kissinger was making his second trip to the People's Republic, the issue of which Chinese government deserved to be represented in the United Nations came up again. Out of concern to not be seen abandoning an ally, the United States tried to promote a compromise under which both Chinese regimes would be UN members, although Kissinger called it "an essentially doomed rearguard action". While American ambassador to the UN George H. W. Bush was lobbying for the "two Chinas" formula, Kissinger was removing favorable references to Taiwan from a speech that Rogers was preparing, as he expected China to be expelled from the UN. During his second visit to Beijing, Kissinger told Zhou that according to a public opinion poll 62% of Americans wanted Taiwan to remain a UN member, and asked him to consider the "two Chinas" compromise to avoid offending American public opinion. Zhou responded with his claim that the People's Republic was the legitimate government of all China and no compromise was possible with the Taiwan issue.  Kissinger said that the United States could not totally sever ties with Chiang, who had been an ally in World War II. Kissinger told Nixon that Bush was "too soft and not sophisticated" enough to properly represent the United States at the UN, and expressed no anger when the UN General Assembly voted to expel Taiwan and give China's seat on the UN Security Council to the People's Republic.

Kissinger's trips paved the way for the groundbreaking 1972 summit between Nixon, Zhou, and Chinese Communist Party Chairman Mao Zedong, as well as the formalization of relations between the two countries, ending 23 years of diplomatic isolation and mutual hostility. The result was the formation of a tacit strategic anti-Soviet alliance between China and the United States. Kissinger's diplomacy led to economic and cultural exchanges between the two sides and the establishment of "liaison offices" in the Chinese and American capitals, though full normalization of relations with China would not occur until 1979.

Vietnam War 

Kissinger's involvement in Indochina started prior to his appointment as National Security Adviser to Nixon. While still at Harvard, he had worked as a consultant on foreign policy to both the White House and State Department. In a 1967 peace initiative, he would mediate between Washington and Hanoi.

When he came into office in 1969, Kissinger favored a negotiating strategy under which the United States and North Vietnam would sign an armistice and agreed to pull their troops out of South Vietnam while the South Vietnamese government and the Viet Cong were to agree to a coalition government. Kissinger had doubts about Nixon's theory of "linkage", believing that this would give the Soviet Union leverage over the United States and unlike Nixon was less concerned about the ultimate fate of South Vietnam. Though Kissinger did not regard South Vietnam as important in its own right, he believed it was necessary to support South Vietnam to maintain the United States as a global power, believing that none of America's allies would trust the United States if South Vietnam were abandoned too quickly.

In early 1969, Kissinger was opposed to the plans for Operation Menu, the bombing of Cambodia, fearing that Nixon was acting rashly with no plans for the diplomatic fall-out, but on March 16, 1969. Nixon announced the bombing would start the next day. As he saw the president was committed, he became more and more supportive. Kissinger would play a key role in bombing Cambodia to disrupt raids into South Vietnam from Cambodia, as well as the 1970 Cambodian campaign and subsequent widespread bombing of Khmer Rouge targets in Cambodia.

The Paris peace talks had become stalemated by late 1969 owing to the obstructionism of the South Vietnamese delegation. The South Vietnamese President Nguyễn Văn Thiệu did not want the United States to withdraw from Vietnam, and out of frustration with him, Kissinger decided to begin secret peace talks with Thọ in Paris parallel to the official talks that the South Vietnamese were unaware of.

In June 1971, Kissinger supported Nixon's effort to ban the Pentagon Papers saying the "hemorrhage of state secrets" to the media was making diplomacy impossible.

On August 1, 1972, Kissinger met Thọ again in Paris, and for first time, he seemed willing to compromise, saying that political and military terms of an armistice could be treated separately and hinted that his government was no longer willing to make the overthrow of Thiệu a precondition.

On the evening of October 8, 1972, at a secret meeting of Kissinger and Thọ in Paris came the decisive breakthrough in the talks. Thọ began with "a very realistic and very simple proposal" for a ceasefire that would see the Americans pull all their forces out of Vietnam in exchange for the release of all the POWs in North Vietnam. Kissinger accepted Thọ's offer as the best deal possible, saying that the "mutual withdrawal formula" had to be abandoned as it been "unobtainable through ten years of war ... We could not make it a condition for a final settlement. We had long passed that threshold".

In the fall of 1972, both Kissinger and Nixon were frustrated with Thiệu's refusal to accept any sort of peace deal calling for withdrawal of American forces. On October 21 Kissinger and the American ambassador Ellsworth Bunker arrived in Saigon to show Thiệu the peace agreement. Thiệu refused to sign the peace agreement and demanded very extensive amendments that Kissinger reported to Nixon "verge on insanity".

Though Nixon had initially supported Kissinger against Thiệu, H.R. Haldeman and John Ehrlichman urged him to reconsider, arguing that Thiệu's objections had merit. Nixon wanted 69 amendments to the draft peace agreement included in the final treaty, and ordered Kissinger back to Paris to force Thọ to accept them. Kissinger regarded Nixon's 69 amendments as "preposterous" as he knew Thọ would never accept them. As expected, Thọ refused to consider any of the 69 amendments, and on December 13, 1972, left Paris for Hanoi. Kissinger by this stage was worked up into a state of fury after Thọ walked out of the Paris talks and told Nixon: "They're just a bunch of shits. Tawdry, filthy shits".

On January 8, 1973, Kissinger and Thọ met again in Paris and the next day reached an agreement, which in main points was essentially the same as the one Nixon had rejected in October with only cosmetic concessions to the Americans. Thiệu once again rejected the peace agreement, only to receive an ultimatum from Nixon which caused Thiệu to reluctantly accept the peace agreement. On January 27, 1973, Kissinger and Thọ signed a peace agreement that called for the complete withdrawal of all U.S. forces from Vietnam by March in exchange for North Vietnam freeing all the U.S. POWs.

Along with Thọ, Kissinger was awarded the Nobel Peace Prize on December 10, 1973, for their work in negotiating the ceasefires contained in the Paris Peace Accords on "Ending the War and Restoring Peace in Vietnam", signed the previous January. According to Irwin Abrams, this prize was the most controversial to date. For the first time in the history of the Peace Prize, two members left the Nobel Committee in protest. Thọ rejected the award, telling Kissinger that peace had not been restored in South Vietnam. Kissinger wrote to the Nobel Committee that he accepted the award "with humility", and "donated the entire proceeds to the children of American servicemembers killed or missing in action in Indochina". After the Fall of Saigon in 1975, Kissinger attempted to return the award.

By the summer of 1974, the U.S. embassy reported that morale in the ARVN had fallen to dangerously low levels and it was uncertain how much longer South Vietnam would last. In August 1974, Congress passed a bill limiting American aid to South Vietnam to $700 million annually. By November 1974, Kissinger lobbied Brezhnev to end Soviet military aid to North Vietnam. The same month, he also lobbied Mao and Zhou to end Chinese military aid to North Vietnam. On April 15, 1975, Kissinger testified before the Senate Appropriations Committee, urging Congress to increase the military aid budget to South Vietnam by another $700 million to save the ARVN as the PAVN was rapidly advancing on Saigon, which was refused. Kissinger maintained at the time, and still maintains, that if only Congress had approved of his request for another $700 million South Vietnam would have been able to resist.

In November 1975, seven months after the Khmer Rouge took power, Kissinger told the Thai foreign minister: "You should tell the Cambodians that we will be friends with them. They are murderous thugs but we won't let that stand in our way." In a 1998 interview, Kissinger said: "some countries, the Chinese in particular supported Pol Pot as a counterweight to the Vietnamese supported people and We at least tolerated it." Kissinger said he didn't approve of this due to the genocide and said he "would not have dealt with Pol Pot for any purpose whatsoever." He further said: "The Thais and the Chinese did not want a Vietnamese-dominated Indochina. We didn't want the Vietnamese to dominate. I don't believe we did anything for Pol Pot. But I suspect we closed our eyes when some others did something for Pol Pot."

Interview with Oriana Fallaci 
On November 4, 1972, Kissinger agreed to an interview with Italian journalist Oriana Fallaci. Kissinger, who rarely engaged in one-on-one interviews with the press and knew very little about Fallaci, accepted her request after reportedly being impressed with her 1969 interview with Võ Nguyên Giáp. The interview turned out to be a political and public relations disaster for Kissinger as he agreed that Vietnam was a "useless war", implied that he preferred to have dinner with Lê Đức Thọ over Nguyễn Văn Thiệu (in her 1976 book Interview with History, Fallaci recalled that Kissinger agreed with many of her negative sentiments towards Thiệu in a private discussion before the interview), and engaged in a now infamous exchange with the hard-pressing Fallaci comparing himself to a Cowboy leading the Nixon Administration:

Nixon was enraged by the interview, in particular the comedic "Cowboy" comparison which infuriated and offended Nixon. For several weeks afterwards, he refused to see Kissinger and even contemplated firing him. At one point, Kissinger, in desperation, drove up unannounced to Nixon's San Clemente residence only to be rejected by Secret Service personnel at the gates.  Kissinger later claimed that it was "the single most disastrous conversation I have ever had with any member of the press". Fallaci, on her part, later described the interview with the evasive, monotonous, non-expressive Kissinger as the most uncomfortable and most difficult she ever did, criticizing Kissinger as a "intellectual adventurer" and a self-styled Metternich.

Bangladesh Liberation War 

Nixon supported Pakistani dictator, General Yahya Khan, in the Bangladesh Liberation War in 1971. Kissinger sneered at people who "bleed" for "the dying Bengalis" and ignored the first telegram from the United States consul general in East Pakistan, Archer K. Blood, and 20 members of his staff, which informed the US that their allies West Pakistan were undertaking, in Blood's words, "a selective genocide" targeting the Bengali intelligentsia, supporters of independence for East Pakistan, and the Hindu minority. In the second, more famous, Blood Telegram the word genocide was again used to describe the events, and further that with its continuing support for West Pakistan the US government had "evidenced ... moral bankruptcy".
As a direct response to the dissent against US policy Kissinger and Nixon ended Archer Blood's tenure as United States consul general in East Pakistan and put him to work in the State Department's Personnel Office. Christopher Clary argues that Nixon and Kissinger were unconsciously biased, leading them to overestimate the likelihood of Pakistani victory against Bengali rebels.

Kissinger was particularly concerned about the expansion of Soviet influence in the Indian subcontinent as a result of a treaty of friendship recently signed by India and the USSR, and sought to demonstrate to the People's Republic of China (Pakistan's ally and an enemy of both India and the USSR) the value of a tacit alliance with the United States.

Kissinger had also come under fire for private comments he made to Nixon during the Bangladesh–Pakistan War in which he described Indian Prime Minister Indira Gandhi as a "bitch" and a "witch". He also said "The Indians are bastards", shortly before the war. Kissinger has since expressed his regret over the comments.

Europe
As National Security Adviser under Nixon, Kissinger pioneered the policy of détente with the Soviet Union, seeking a relaxation in tensions between the two superpowers. As a part of this strategy, he negotiated the Strategic Arms Limitation Talks (culminating in the SALT I treaty) and the Anti-Ballistic Missile Treaty with Leonid Brezhnev, General Secretary of the Soviet Communist Party. Negotiations about strategic disarmament were originally supposed to start under the Johnson Administration but were postponed in protest upon the invasion by Warsaw Pact troops of Czechoslovakia in August 1968.

Nixon felt his administration had neglected relations with the Western European states in his first term and in September 1972 decided that if he was reelected that 1973 would be the "Year of Europe" as the United States would focus on relations with the states of the European Economic Community (EEC) which had emerged as a serious economic rival by 1970. Applying his favorite "linkage" concept, Nixon intended henceforward economic relations with Europe would not be severed from security relations, and if the EEC states wanted changes in American tariff and monetary policies, the price would be defense spending on their part. Kissinger in particular as part of the "Year of Europe" wanted to "revitalize" NATO, which he called a "decaying" alliance as he believed that there was nothing at present to stop the Red Army from overrunning Western Europe in a conventional forces conflict. The "linkage" concept more applied to the question of security as Kissinger noted that the United States was going to sacrifice NATO for the sake of "citrus fruits".

Israeli policy and Soviet Jewry

According to notes taken by H. R. Haldeman, Nixon "ordered his aides to exclude all Jewish-Americans from policy-making on Israel", including Kissinger. One note quotes Nixon as saying "get K. [Kissinger] out of the play—Haig handle it".

In 1973, Kissinger did not feel that pressing the Soviet Union concerning the plight of Jews being persecuted there was in the interest of U.S. foreign policy. In conversation with Nixon shortly after a meeting with Israeli Prime Minister Golda Meir on March 1, 1973, Kissinger stated, "The emigration of Jews from the Soviet Union is not an objective of American foreign policy, and if they put Jews into gas chambers in the Soviet Union, it is not an American concern. Maybe a humanitarian concern."

Arab–Israeli dispute

In September 1973, Nixon fired Rogers as Secretary of State and replaced him with Kissinger. He would later state he had not been given enough time to know the Middle East as he settled into the State Department. Kissinger later admitted that he was so engrossed with the Paris peace talks to end the Vietnam war that he and others in Washington missed the significance of the Egyptian-Saudi alliance. Sadat expected as a reward that the United States would respond by pressuring Israel to return the Sinai to Egypt, but after receiving no response from the United States, by November 1972 Sadat moved again closer to the Soviet Union, buying a massive amount of Soviet arms for a war he planned to launch against Israel in 1973.

Kissinger delayed telling President Richard Nixon about the start of the Yom Kippur War in 1973 in order to keep him from interfering in the nascent conflict. On October 6, 1973, the Israelis informed Kissinger about the attack at 6 am; Kissinger waited nearly  hours before he informed Nixon. According to Kissinger, he was notified at 6:30 a.m. (12:30 pm. Israel time) that war was imminent, and his urgent calls to the Soviets and Egyptians were ineffective. On October 12, under Nixon's direction, and against Kissinger's initial advice, while Kissinger was on his way to Moscow to discuss conditions for a cease-fire, Nixon sent a message to Brezhnev giving Kissinger full negotiating authority. Kissinger wanted to stall a ceasefire to gain more time for Israel to push across the Suez Canal to the African side, and wanted to be perceived as a mere presidential emissary who needed to consult the White House all the time as a stalling tactic.

Kissinger promised the Israeli Prime Minister Golda Meir that the United States would replace its losses in equipment after the war, but sought initially to delay arm shipments to Israel, as he believed it would improve the odds of making peace along the lines of United Nations Security Council Resolution 242. In 1973, Meir requested $850 million worth of American arms and equipment to replace its material losses. Nixon instead sent some $2 billion worth. The arms lift enraged King Faisal of Saudi Arabia, and he retaliated on October 20, 1973, by placing a total embargo on oil shipments to the United States, to be joined by all of the other oil-producing Arab states except Iraq and Libya.

On November 7, 1973, Kissinger flew to Riyadh to meet King Faisal and to ask him to end the oil embargo in exchange for promising to be "even handed" in the Arab-Israeli dispute. Despite all of Kissinger's efforts to charm him, Faisal refused to lift the oil embargo. Only on March 19, 1974, did the king end the oil embargo, after Sadat reported to him that the United States was being more "even handed" and after Kissinger had promised to sell Saudi Arabia weapons that it had previously denied under the grounds that they might be used against Israel.

Kissinger pressured the Israelis to cede some of the newly captured land back to its Arab neighbors, contributing to the first phases of Israeli–Egyptian non-aggression. In 1973–74, Kissinger engaged in "shuttle diplomacy" flying between Tel Aviv, Cairo, and Damascus in a bid to make the armistice the basis of a preferment peace. Kissinger's first meeting with Hafez al-Assad lasted 6 hours and 30 minutes, causing the press to believe for a moment that he had been kidnapped by the Syrians.  In his memoirs, Kissinger described how, during the course of his 28 meetings in Damascus in 1973–74, Assad "negotiated tenaciously and daringly like a riverboat gambler to make sure he had exacted the last sliver of available concessions".

In contrast, Kissinger's negotiations with Sadat, though not without difficulties, were more fruitful. The move saw a warming in U.S.–Egyptian relations, bitter since the 1950s, as the country moved away from its former independent stance and into a close partnership with the United States.

Kissinger had avoided involving France and the United Kingdom, the former European colonial powers of the Middle East, in the peace negotiations that followed the Yom Kippur, being primarily focused on minimising the Soviet Union's sway over the peace negotiations and on moderating the international influences on the Arab-Israeli conflict. President Pompidou of France was concerned and perturbed by this development, viewing it as an indication of the United States' ambitions of hegemonically domineering the region.

Persian Gulf

A major concern for Kissinger was the possibility of Soviet influence in the Persian Gulf. In April 1969, Iraq came into conflict with Iran when Shah Mohammad Reza Pahlavi renounced the 1937 treaty governing the Shatt-al-Arab river. On December 1, 1971, after two years of skirmishes along the border, President Ahmed Hassan al-Bakr broke off diplomatic relations with Iran. In May 1972, Nixon and Kissinger visited Tehran to tell the Shah that there would be no "second-guessing of his requests" to buy American weapons. At the same time, Nixon and Kissinger agreed a plan of the Shah's that the United States together with Iran and Israel would support the Kurdish peshmerga guerrillas fighting for independence from Iraq. Kissinger later wrote that after Vietnam, there was no possibility of deploying American forces in the Middle East, and henceforward Iran was to act as America's surrogate in the Persian Gulf. Kissinger described the Baathist regime in Iraq as a potential threat to the United States and believed that building up Iran and supporting the peshmerga was the best counterweight.

Turkish invasion of Cyprus

Following a period of steady relations between the U.S. Government and the Greek military regime after 1967, Secretary of State Kissinger was faced with the coup by the Greek junta and the Turkish invasion of Cyprus in July and August 1974. In an August 1974 edition of The New York Times, it was revealed that Kissinger and State Department were informed in advance of the impending coup by the Greek junta in Cyprus. Indeed, according to the journalist, the official version of events as told by the State Department was that it felt it had to warn the Greek military regime not to carry out the coup. Kissinger was a target of anti-American sentiment which was a significant feature of Greek public opinion at the time—particularly among young people—viewing the U.S. role in Cyprus as negative. In a demonstration by students in Heraklion, Crete, soon after the second phase of the Turkish invasion in August 1974, slogans such as "Kissinger, murderer", "Americans get out", "No to Partition" and "Cyprus is no Vietnam" were heard. Some years later, Kissinger expressed the opinion that the Cyprus issue was resolved in 1974. The New York Times and other major newspapers were highly critical, and even State Department officials did not hide their dissatisfaction with his alleged arrogance and ignorance of the basics.

However, Kissinger never felt comfortable with the way he handled the Cyprus issue. Journalist Alexis Papahelas stated that Kissinger's "facial expression changes markedly when someone—usually Greek or Cypriot - refers to the crisis". According to him, Kissinger had felt since the summer of 1974 that history would not treat him lightly in relation to his actions.

Latin American policy

The United States continued to recognize and maintain relationships with non-left-wing governments, democratic and authoritarian alike. John F. Kennedy's Alliance for Progress was ended in 1973. In 1974, negotiations over a new settlement for the Panama Canal began, and they eventually led to the Torrijos–Carter Treaties and the handing over of the Canal to Panamanian control.

Kissinger initially supported the normalization of United States–Cuba relations, broken since 1961 (all U.S.–Cuban trade was blocked in February 1962, a few weeks after the exclusion of Cuba from the Organization of American States because of U.S. pressure). However, he quickly changed his mind and followed Kennedy's policy. After the involvement of the Cuban Revolutionary Armed Forces in the independence struggles in Angola and Mozambique, Kissinger said that unless Cuba withdrew its forces relations would not be normalized. Cuba refused.

Intervention in Chile

Chilean Socialist Party presidential candidate Salvador Allende was elected by a plurality of 36.2 percent in 1970, causing serious concern in Washington, D.C., due to his openly socialist and pro-Cuban politics. The Nixon administration, with Kissinger's input, authorized the Central Intelligence Agency (CIA) to encourage a military coup that would prevent Allende's inauguration, but the plan was not successful.

On September 11, 1973, Allende died during a military coup launched by Army Commander-in-Chief Augusto Pinochet, who became president. In September 1976, Orlando Letelier, a Chilean opponent of the new Pinochet regime, was assassinated in Washington, D.C., with a car bomb. Previously, Kissinger had helped secure his release from prison, and had chosen to cancel an official U.S. letter to Chile warning them against carrying out any political assassinations. This murder was part of Operation Condor, a covert program of political repression and assassination carried out by Southern Cone nations that Kissinger has been accused of being involved in.

On September 10, 2001, the family of Chilean general René Schneider filed a suit against Kissinger, accusing him of collaborating in arranging Schneider's kidnapping which resulted in his death. The case was later dismissed by the U.S. District Court for the District of Columbia, citing separation of powers: "The decision to support a coup of the Chilean government to prevent Dr. Allende from coming to power, and the means by which the United States Government sought to effect that goal, implicate policy makers in the murky realm of foreign affairs and national security best left to the political branches." Decades later, the CIA admitted its involvement in the kidnapping of General Schneider, but not his murder, and subsequently paid the group responsible for his death $35,000 "to keep the prior contact secret, maintain the goodwill of the group, and for humanitarian reasons".

Argentina

Kissinger took a similar line as he had toward Chile when the Argentine Armed Forces, led by Jorge Videla, toppled the elected government of Isabel Perón in 1976 with a process called the National Reorganization Process by the military, with which they consolidated power, launching brutal reprisals and "disappearances" against political opponents. An October 1987 investigative report in The Nation broke the story of how, in a June 1976 meeting in the Hotel Carrera in Santiago, Kissinger gave the military junta in neighboring Argentina the "green light" for their own clandestine repression against leftwing guerrillas and other dissidents, thousands of whom were kept in more than 400 secret concentration camps before they were executed. During a meeting with Argentine foreign minister César Augusto Guzzetti, Kissinger assured him that the United States was an ally, but urged him to "get back to normal procedures" quickly before the U.S. Congress reconvened and had a chance to consider sanctions.

As the article published in The Nation noted, as the state-sponsored terror mounted, conservative Republican U.S. Ambassador to Buenos Aires Robert C. Hill was shaken, he became very disturbed, by the case of the son of a thirty-year embassy employee, a student who was arrested, never to be seen again,' recalled Juan de Onis, former reporter for The New York Times. 'Hill took a personal interest.' He went to the Interior Minister, a general with whom he had worked on drug cases, saying, 'Hey, what about this? We're interested in this case.' He questioned (Foreign Minister Cesar) Guzzetti and, finally, President Jorge R. Videla himself. 'All he got was stonewalling; he got nowhere.' de Onis said. 'His last year was marked by increasing disillusionment and dismay, and he backed his staff on human rights right to the hilt."

In a letter to The Nation editor Victor Navasky, protesting publication of the article, Kissinger claimed that: "At any rate, the notion of Hill as a passionate human rights advocate is news to all his former associates." Yet Kissinger aide Harry W. Shlaudeman later disagreed with Kissinger, telling the oral historian William E. Knight of the Association for Diplomatic Studies and Training Foreign Affairs Oral History Project: "It really came to a head when I was Assistant Secretary, or it began to come to a head, in the case of Argentina where the dirty war was in full flower. Bob Hill, who was Ambassador then in Buenos Aires, a very conservative Republican politician—by no means liberal or anything of the kind, began to report quite effectively about what was going on, this slaughter of innocent civilians, supposedly innocent civilians—this vicious war that they were conducting, underground war. He, at one time in fact, sent me a back-channel telegram saying that the Foreign Minister, who had just come for a visit to Washington and had returned to Buenos Aires, had gloated to him that Kissinger had said nothing to him about human rights. I don't know—I wasn't present at the interview."

Navasky later wrote in his book about being confronted by Kissinger, Tell me, Mr. Navasky,' [Kissinger] said in his famous guttural tones, 'how is it that a short article in a obscure journal such as yours about a conversation that was supposed to have taken place years ago about something that did or didn't happen in Argentina resulted in sixty people holding placards denouncing me a few months ago at the airport when I got off the plane in Copenhagen?

According to declassified state department files, Kissinger also hindered the Carter administration's efforts to halt the mass killings by the 1976–1983 military dictatorship by visiting the country and praising the regime.

Brazil's nuclear weapons program
Kissinger was in favor of accommodating Brazil while it pursued a nuclear weapons program in the 1970s. Kissinger justified his position by arguing that Brazil was a U.S. ally and on the grounds that it would benefit private nuclear industry actors in the U.S. Kissinger's position on Brazil was out of sync with influential voices in the U.S. Congress, the State Department, and the U.S. Arms Control and Disarmament Agency.

Rhodesia
In September 1976, Kissinger was actively involved in negotiations regarding the Rhodesian Bush War. Kissinger, along with South Africa's Prime Minister John Vorster, pressured Rhodesian Prime Minister Ian Smith to hasten the transition to black majority rule in Rhodesia. With FRELIMO in control of Mozambique and even the apartheid regime of South Africa withdrawing its support, Rhodesia's isolation was nearly complete. According to Smith's autobiography, Kissinger told Smith of Mrs. Kissinger's admiration for him, but Smith stated that he thought Kissinger was asking him to sign Rhodesia's "death certificate". Kissinger, bringing the weight of the United States, and corralling other relevant parties to put pressure on Rhodesia, hastened the end of white minority rule.

Portuguese Empire
In contrast to the unfriendly disposition of the previous Kennedy and Johnson administrations towards the racist, corporatist Estado Novo regime of Portugal, particularly with regards to its stubborn, quixotic attempts to maintain the Portuguese Colonial Empire by waging the Portuguese Colonial War against anti-colonial rebellions in defence of its empire, the Department of State under Kissinger adopted a more conciliatory attitude towards Portugal. In 1971, the administration of President Nixon successfully renewed the lease of the American military base in the Azores, despite condemnation from the Congressional Black Caucus and some members of the Senate. Though privately continuing to view Portugal contemptibly for its atavistic foreign policy towards Africa, Kissinger publicly expressed thanks for Portugal's agreement to use its military base in Lajes in the Azores to resupply Israel in the Yom Kippur War. Following the fall of the far-right Portuguese regime in 1974, Kissinger worried that the new government's hasty decolonisation plan might benefit radical factions such as the MPLA in Angola. He also expressed concern that the inclusion of the Portuguese Communist Party in the new Portuguese government could legitimise communist parties in other NATO member states, such as Italy.

East Timor

The Portuguese decolonization process brought U.S. attention to the former Portuguese colony of East Timor, which declared its independence in 1975. Indonesian president Suharto regarded East Timor as rightfully part of Indonesia. In December 1975, Suharto discussed invasion plans during a meeting with Kissinger and President Ford in the Indonesian capital of Jakarta. Both Ford and Kissinger made clear that U.S. relations with Indonesia would remain strong and that it would not object to the proposed annexation. They only wanted it done "fast" and proposed that it be delayed until after they had returned to Washington. Accordingly, Suharto delayed the operation for one day. Finally on December 7, Indonesian forces invaded the former Portuguese colony. U.S. arms sales to Indonesia continued, and Suharto went ahead with the annexation plan. According to Ben Kiernan, the invasion and occupation resulted in the deaths of nearly a quarter of the Timorese population from 1975 to 1981.

Cuba
During the 1970 Cienfuegos Crisis, in which the Soviet Navy was strongly suspected of building a submarine base in the Cuban city of Cienfuegos, Kissinger met with Anatoly Dobrynin, Soviet Ambassador to the United States, informing him that the United States government considered this act a violation of the agreements made in 1962 by President John F. Kennedy and Premier Nikita Khrushchev in the wake of the Cuban Missile Crisis, prompting the Soviets to halt construction of their planned base in Cienfuegos.

In February 1976, Kissinger considered launching air strikes against ports and military installations in Cuba, as well as deploying U.S. Marine Corps battalions based at the US Navy base at Guantanamo Bay, in retaliation for Cuban President Fidel Castro's decision in late 1975 to send troops to newly independent Angola to help the MPLA in its fight against UNITA and South Africa during the start of the Angolan Civil War.

Western Sahara

The Kissingerian doctrine endorsed the forced concession of Spanish Sahara to Morocco. At the height of the 1975 Sahara crisis, Kissinger misled Gerald Ford into thinking the International Court of Justice had ruled in favor of Morocco. Kissinger was aware in advance of the Moroccan plans for the invasion of the territory, materialized on November 6, 1975, in the so-called Green March.

Zaire
Kissinger was involved in furthering cooperation between America and the Zaire dictator Mobutu Sese Seko and held multiple meetings with him. Kissinger would describe these efforts as "one of our policy successes in Africa" and praised Mobutu as "courageous, politically astute" and "relatively honest in a country where governmental corruption is a way of life".

Later roles

After Nixon was forced to resign in the Watergate scandal, Kissinger's influence in the new presidential administration of Gerald R. Ford was diminished after he was replaced by Brent Scowcroft as National Security Advisor during the "Halloween Massacre" cabinet reshuffle of November 1975. Kissinger left office as Secretary of State when Democrat Jimmy Carter defeated Republican Gerald Ford in the 1976 presidential elections.

Kissinger continued to participate in policy groups, such as the Trilateral Commission, and to maintain political consulting, speaking, and writing engagements. In 1978, he was secretly involved in thwarting efforts by the Carter administration to indict three Chilean intelligence agents for masterminding the 1976 assassination of Orlando Letelier. Kissinger was critical of the foreign policy of the Jimmy Carter administration, saying in 1980 that "has managed the extraordinary feat of having, at one and the same time, the worst relations with our allies, the worst relations with our adversaries, and the most serious upheavals in the developing world since the end of the Second World War."

After Kissinger left office in 1977, he was offered an endowed chair at Columbia University. There was student opposition to the appointment, which became a subject of media commentary. Columbia canceled the appointment as a result.

Kissinger was then appointed to Georgetown University's Center for Strategic and International Studies. He taught at Georgetown's Edmund Walsh School of Foreign Service for several years in the late 1970s. In 1982, with the help of a loan from the international banking firm of E.M. Warburg, Pincus and Company, Kissinger founded a consulting firm, Kissinger Associates, and is a partner in affiliate Kissinger McLarty Associates with Mack McLarty, former chief of staff to President Bill Clinton. He also serves on the board of directors of Hollinger International, a Chicago-based newspaper group, and as of March 1999, was a director of Gulfstream Aerospace.

In September 1989, the Wall Street Journals John Fialka disclosed that Kissinger took a direct economic interest in US-China relations in March 1989 with the establishment of China Ventures, Inc., a Delaware limited partnership, of which he was chairman of the board and chief executive officer. A US$75 million investment in a joint venture with the Communist Party government's primary commercial vehicle at the time, China International Trust & Investment Corporation (CITIC), was its purpose. Board members were major clients of Kissinger Associates. Kissinger was criticised for not disclosing his role in the venture when called upon by ABC's Peter Jennings to comment the morning after the June 4, 1989, Tiananmen Square massacre. Kissinger's position was generally supportive of Deng Xiaoping's decision to use the military against the demonstrating students and he opposed economic sanctions.

From 1995 to 2001, Kissinger served on the board of directors for Freeport-McMoRan, a multinational copper and gold producer with significant mining and milling operations in Papua, Indonesia. In February 2000, then-president of Indonesia Abdurrahman Wahid appointed Kissinger as a political advisor. He also serves as an honorary advisor to the United States-Azerbaijan Chamber of Commerce.

In 1998, in response to the 2002 Winter Olympic bid scandal, the International Olympic Committee formed a commission, called the "2000 Commission", to recommend reforms, which Kissinger served on. This service led in 2000 to his appointment as one of five IOC "honor members", a category the organization described as granted to "eminent personalities from outside the IOC who have rendered particularly outstanding services to it".

Kissinger served as the 22nd Chancellor of the College of William and Mary from 2000 to 2005. He was preceded by Prime Minister Margaret Thatcher, and succeeded by Justice Sandra Day O'Connor. The College of William & Mary also own a painted portrait of Kissinger that was painted by Ned Bittinger.

From 2000 to 2006, Kissinger served as chairman of the board of trustees of Eisenhower Fellowships. In 2006, upon his departure from Eisenhower Fellowships, he received the Dwight D. Eisenhower Medal for Leadership and Service.

In November 2002, he was appointed by President George W. Bush to chair the newly established National Commission on Terrorist Attacks Upon the United States to investigate the September 11 attacks. Kissinger stepped down as chairman on December 13, 2002, rather than reveal his business client list, when queried about potential conflicts of interest.

In the Rio Tinto espionage case of 2009–2010, Kissinger was paid $5 million to advise the multinational mining company how to distance itself from an employee who had been arrested in China for bribery.

Kissinger—along with William Perry, Sam Nunn, and George Shultz—has called upon governments to embrace the vision of a world free of nuclear weapons, and in three Wall Street Journal op-eds proposed an ambitious program of urgent steps to that end. The four have created the Nuclear Threat Initiative to advance this agenda. In 2010, the four were featured in a documentary film entitled Nuclear Tipping Point. The film is a visual and historical depiction of the ideas laid forth in the Wall Street Journal op-eds and reinforces their commitment to a world without nuclear weapons and the steps that can be taken to reach that goal.

In December 2008, Kissinger was given the American Patriot Award by the National Defense University Foundation "in recognition for his distinguished career in public service".

On November 17, 2016, Kissinger met with then President-elect Donald Trump during which they discussed global affairs. Kissinger also met with President Trump at the White House in May 2017.

In an interview with Charlie Rose on August 17, 2017, Kissinger said about President Trump: "I'm hoping for an Augustinian moment, for St. Augustine ... who in his early life followed a pattern that was quite incompatible with later on when he had a vision, and rose to sainthood. One does not expect the president to become that, but it's conceivable". Kissinger also argued that Russian President Vladimir Putin wanted to weaken Hillary Clinton, not elect Donald Trump. Kissinger said that Putin "thought—wrongly incidentally—that she would be extremely confrontational ... I think he tried to weaken the incoming president [Clinton]".

Views on U.S. foreign policy

Yugoslav Wars

In several articles of his and interviews that he gave during the Yugoslav Wars, he criticized the United States' policies in Southeast Europe, among other things for the recognition of Bosnia and Herzegovina as a sovereign state, which he described as a foolish act. Most importantly he dismissed the notion of Serbs and Croats being aggressors or separatist, saying that "they can't be separating from something that has never existed". In addition, he repeatedly warned the West against inserting itself into a conflict that has its roots at least hundreds of years back in time, and said that the West would do better if it allowed the Serbs and Croats to join their respective countries. Kissinger shared similarly critical views on Western involvement in Kosovo. In particular, he held a disparaging view of the Rambouillet Agreement:

However, as the Serbs did not accept the Rambouillet text and NATO bombings started, he opted for a continuation of the bombing as NATO's credibility was now at stake, but dismissed the use of ground forces, claiming that it was not worth it.

Iraq

In 2006, it was reported in the book State of Denial by Bob Woodward that Kissinger met regularly with President George W. Bush and Vice President Dick Cheney to offer advice on the Iraq War. Kissinger confirmed in recorded interviews with Woodward that the advice was the same as he had given in a column in The Washington Post on August 12, 2005: "Victory over the insurgency is the only meaningful exit strategy." Kissinger also frequently met with U.S. Secretary of State Colin Powell, who he warned that Coalition Provisional Authority Director L. Paul Bremer was "a control freak".

In an interview on the BBC's Sunday AM on November 19, 2006, Kissinger was asked whether there is any hope left for a clear military victory in Iraq and responded, "If you mean by 'military victory' an Iraqi government that can be established and whose writ runs across the whole country, that gets the civil war under control and sectarian violence under control in a time period that the political processes of the democracies will support, I don't believe that is possible. ... I think we have to redefine the course. But I don't believe that the alternative is between military victory as it had been defined previously, or total withdrawal."

In an interview with Peter Robinson of the Hoover Institution on April 3, 2008, Kissinger reiterated that even though he supported the 2003 invasion of Iraq, he thought that the George W. Bush administration rested too much of its case for war on Saddam's supposed weapons of mass destruction. Robinson noted that Kissinger had criticized the administration for invading with too few troops, for disbanding the Iraqi Army as part of de-Baathification, and for mishandling relations with certain allies.

India
Kissinger said in April 2008 that "India has parallel objectives to the United States", and he called it an ally of the U.S.

China

Kissinger was present at the opening ceremony of the 2008 Beijing Summer Olympics. A few months before the Games opened, as controversy over China's human rights record was intensifying due to criticism by Amnesty International and other groups of the widespread use of the death penalty and other issues, Kissinger told the PRC's official press agency Xinhua: "I think one should separate Olympics as a sporting event from whatever political disagreements people may have had with China. I expect that the games will proceed in the spirit for which they were designed, which is friendship among nations, and that other issues are discussed in other forums." He said China had made huge efforts to stage the Games. "Friends of China should not use the Olympics to pressure China now." He added that he would bring two of his grandchildren to watch the Games and planned to attend the opening ceremony. During the Games, he participated with Australian swimmer Ian Thorpe, film star Jackie Chan, and former British PM Tony Blair at a Peking University forum on the qualities that make a champion. He sat with his wife Nancy Kissinger, President George W. Bush, former President George H. W. Bush, and Foreign Minister Yang Jiechi at the men's basketball game between China and the U.S.

In 2011, Kissinger published On China, chronicling the evolution of Sino-American relations and laying out the challenges to a partnership of "genuine strategic trust" between the U.S. and China.

In his 2011 book On China, his 2014 book World Order and in a 2018 interview with Financial Times, Kissinger stated that he believes China wants to restore its historic role as the Middle Kingdom and be "the principal adviser to all humanity".

In 2020, during a period of worsening Sino-American relations caused by the COVID-19 pandemic, the Hong Kong protests, and the U.S.–China trade war, Kissinger expressed concerns that the United States and China are entering a Second Cold War and will eventually become embroiled in a military conflict similar to World War I. He called for Chinese President Xi Jinping and the incoming U.S. President-elect Joe Biden to take a less confrontational foreign policy. Kissinger previously said that a potential war between China and the United States would be "worse than the world wars that ruined European civilization".

Iran
Kissinger's position on this issue of U.S.–Iran talks was reported by the Tehran Times to be that "Any direct talks between the U.S. and Iran on issues such as the nuclear dispute would be most likely to succeed if they first involved only diplomatic staff and progressed to the level of secretary of state before the heads of state meet." In 2016, Kissinger said that the biggest challenge facing the Middle East is the "potential domination of the region by an Iran that is both imperial and jihadist". He further wrote in August 2017 that if the Islamic Revolutionary Guard Corps of Iran and its Shiite allies were allowed to fill the territorial vacuum left by a militarily defeated Islamic State of Iraq and the Levant, the region would be left with a land corridor extending from Iran to the Levant "which could mark the emergence of an Iranian radical empire". Commenting on the Joint Comprehensive Plan of Action, Kissinger said that he would not have agreed to it, but that Trump's plan to end the agreement after it was signed would "enable the Iranians to do more than us".

2014 Ukrainian crisis

On March 5, 2014, The Washington Post published an op-ed piece by Kissinger, 11 days before the Crimean referendum on whether Autonomous Republic of Crimea should officially rejoin Ukraine or join neighboring Russia. In it, he attempted to balance the Ukrainian, Russian and Western desires for a functional state. He made four main points:
 Ukraine should have the right to choose freely its economic and political associations, including with Europe;
 Ukraine should not join NATO, a repetition of the position he took seven years before;
 Ukraine should be free to create any government compatible with the expressed will of its people. Wise Ukrainian leaders would then opt for a policy of reconciliation between the various parts of their country. He imagined an international position for Ukraine like that of Finland.
 Ukraine should maintain sovereignty over Crimea.

Kissinger also wrote: "The west speaks Ukrainian; the east speaks mostly Russian. Any attempt by one wing of Ukraine to dominate the other—as has been the pattern—would lead eventually to civil war or break up."

Following the publication of his book titled World Order, Kissinger participated in an interview with Charlie Rose and updated his position on Ukraine, which he sees as a possible geographical mediator between Russia and the West. In a question he posed to himself for illustration regarding re-conceiving policy regarding Ukraine, Kissinger stated: "If Ukraine is considered an outpost, then the situation is that its eastern border is the NATO strategic line, and NATO will be within  of Volgograd. That will never be accepted by Russia. On the other hand, if the Russian western line is at the border of Poland, Europe will be permanently disquieted. The Strategic objective should have been to see whether one can build Ukraine as a bridge between East and West, and whether one can do it as a kind of a joint effort."

In December 2016, Kissinger advised then President-elect Donald Trump to accept "Crimea as a part of Russia" in an attempt to secure a rapprochement between the United States and Russia, whose relations soured as a result of the Crimean crisis. When asked if he explicitly considered Russia's sovereignty over Crimea legitimate, Kissinger answered in the affirmative, reversing the position he took in his Washington Post op-ed.

Computers and nuclear weapons
In 2019, Kissinger wrote about the increasing tendency to give control of nuclear weapons to computers operating with artificial intelligence (AI) that: "Adversaries' ignorance of AI-developed configurations will become a strategic advantage". Kissinger argued that giving power to launch nuclear weapons to computers using algorithms to make decisions would eliminate the human factor and give the advantage to the state that had the most effective AI system as a computer can make decisions about war and peace far faster than any human ever could. Just as an AI-enhanced computer can win chess games by anticipating human decision-making, an AI-enhanced computer could be useful in a crisis as in a nuclear war, the side that strikes first would have the advantage by destroying the opponent's nuclear capacity. Kissinger also noted there was always the danger that a computer could make a decision to start a nuclear war before diplomacy had been exhausted, or for a reason that would not be understandable to the operators. Kissinger also warned the use of AI to control nuclear weapons would impose "opacity" on the decision-making process as the algorithms that control the AI system are not readily understandable, destabilizing the decision-making process:

COVID-19 pandemic 
On April 3, 2020, Kissinger shared his diagnostic view of the COVID-19 pandemic, saying that it threatens the "liberal world order". Kissinger added that the virus does not know borders although global leaders are trying to address the crisis on a mainly national basis. He stressed that the key is not a purely national effort but greater international cooperation.

2022 Russian invasion of Ukraine
In May 2022, speaking to the World Economic Forum on the 2022 Russian invasion of Ukraine, Kissinger advocated for a diplomatic settlement that would restore the status quo ante bellum, effectively ceding Crimea and parts of Donbas to Russian control. Kissinger urged Ukrainians to "match the heroism they have shown with wisdom", arguing that "[p]ursuing the war beyond that point would not be about the freedom of Ukraine, but a new war against Russia itself." He spoke to Edward Luce and a Financial Times audience in the same month. Ukrainian President Volodymyr Zelenskyy rejected Kissinger's suggestions, saying Ukraine would not agree to peace until Russia agreed to return Crimea and the Donbas region to Ukraine.

On a book tour to sell "Leadership: Six Studies in World Strategy" in July 2022 he spoke to Judy Woodruff of PBS and he was still of the opinion that "a negotiation is desirable" and clarified his earlier statements, saying that he supported a ceasefire line on the borders of 24 February and that "Russia should not gain anything from the war... Ukraine above all cannot give up territory that it had when the war started because this would be symbolically dangerous."

On 18 January 2023 Kissinger was interviewed by Graham Allison for a World Economic Forum audience; he said that US support should be intensified until either the 24 February borders are reached or the 24 February borders are recognized, upon which time under a ceasefire agreement negotiations would begin. Kissinger feels that Russia needs to be given an opportunity to rejoin the comity of nations while the sanctions are maintained until final settlement is reached. He expressed his admiration for president Zelensky and lauded the heroic conduct of the Ukrainian people. Kissinger feels that the invasion has ipso facto its logical outcome pointed to NATO membership for Ukraine at the end of the peace process.

Public perception
At the height of Kissinger's prominence, many commented on his wit. In February 1972, at the Washington Press Club annual congressional dinner, "Kissinger mocked his reputation as a secret swinger." The insight, "Power is the ultimate aphrodisiac", is widely attributed to him, although Kissinger was paraphrasing Napoleon Bonaparte.

A 2015 survey of top international relations scholars conducted by the College of William & Mary ranked Kissinger as the most effective U.S. Secretary of State in the 50 years to 2015. A number of activists and human rights lawyers have sought his prosecution for alleged war crimes. According to historian and Kissinger biographer Niall Ferguson, accusing Kissinger alone of war crimes "requires a double standard" because "nearly all the secretaries of state ... and nearly all the presidents" have taken similar actions. Ferguson adds "this is not to say that it's all OK."

Some have blamed Kissinger for injustices in American foreign policy during his tenure in government. In September 2001, relatives and survivors of General Rene Schneider (former head of the Chilean general staff) filed civil proceedings in Federal Court in Washington, DC, and, in April 2002, a petition for Kissinger's arrest was filed in the High Court in London by human rights campaigner Peter Tatchell, citing the destruction of civilian populations and the environment in Indochina during the years 1969–1975. British-American journalist and author Christopher Hitchens authored The Trial of Henry Kissinger, in which Hitchens calls for the prosecution of Kissinger "for war crimes, for crimes against humanity, and for offenses against common or customary or international law, including conspiracy to commit murder, kidnap, and torture". Critics on the right, such as Ray Takeyh, have faulted Kissinger for his role in the Nixon administration's opening to China and secret negotiations with North Vietnam. Takeyh writes that while rapprochement with China was a worthy goal, the Nixon administration failed to achieve any meaningful concessions from Chinese officials in return, as China continued to support North Vietnam and various "revolutionary forces throughout the Third World", "nor does there appear to be even a remote, indirect connection between Nixon and Kissinger's diplomacy and the communist leadership's decision, after Mao's bloody rule, to move away from a communist economy towards state capitalism."

Historian Jeffrey Kimball developed the theory that Kissinger and the Nixon administration accepted a South Vietnamese collapse provided a face-saving decent interval passed between American withdrawal and defeat. In his first meeting with Zhou Enlai in 1971, Kissinger "laid out in detail the settlement terms that would produce such a delayed defeat: total American withdrawal, return of all American POWs, and a ceasefire-in-place for '18 months or some period, in the words of historian Ken Hughes. On October 6, 1972, Kissinger told Nixon twice that the terms of the Paris Peace Accords would probably destroy South Vietnam: "I also think that Thieu is right, that our terms will eventually destroy him." However, Kissinger denied using a "decent interval" strategy, writing "All of us who negotiated the agreement of October 12 were convinced that we had vindicated the anguish of a decade not by a 'decent interval' but by a decent settlement." Johannes Kadura offers a positive assessment of Nixon and Kissinger's strategy, arguing that the two men "simultaneously maintained a Plan A of further supporting Saigon and a Plan B of shielding Washington should their maneuvers prove futile." According to Kadura, the "decent interval" concept has been "largely misrepresented", in that Nixon and Kissinger "sought to gain time, make the North turn inward, and create a perpetual equilibrium" rather than acquiescing in the collapse of South Vietnam.

Kissinger's record was brought up during the 2016 Democratic Party presidential primaries. Hillary Clinton had cultivated a close relationship with Kissinger, describing him as a "friend" and a source of "counsel". During the Democratic Primary Debates, Clinton touted Kissinger's praise for her record as Secretary of State. In response, candidate Bernie Sanders issued a critique of Kissinger's foreign policy, declaring, "I am proud to say that Henry Kissinger is not my friend. I will not take advice from Henry Kissinger."

Family and personal life

Kissinger married Ann Fleischer on February 6, 1949. They had two children, Elizabeth and David, and divorced in 1964. On March 30, 1974, he married Nancy Maginnes. They now live in Kent, Connecticut, and in New York City. Kissinger's son David Kissinger served as an executive with NBC Universal Television Studio before becoming head of Conaco, Conan O'Brien's production company, in 2005. In February 1982, at the age of 58, Henry Kissinger underwent coronary bypass surgery.

Kissinger described Diplomacy as his favorite game in a 1973 interview.

Soccer

Daryl Grove characterised Kissinger as one of the most influential people in the growth of soccer in the United States. Kissinger was named chairman of the North American Soccer League board of directors in 1978.

Since his childhood, Kissinger has been a fan of his hometown's soccer club, SpVgg Fürth (now SpVgg Greuther Fürth). Even during his time in office, the German Embassy informed him about the team's results every Monday morning. He is an honorary member with lifetime season-tickets. In September 2012 Kissinger attended a home game in which SpVgg Greuther Fürth lost, 0–2, against Schalke, after promising years ago he would attend a Greuther Fürth home game if they were promoted to the Bundesliga, the top football league in Germany, from the 2. Bundesliga.

Awards, honors, and associations
 Kissinger and Le Duc Tho were jointly offered the 1973 Nobel Peace Prize for their work on the Paris Peace Accords which prompted the withdrawal of American forces from the Vietnam war. (Le Duc Tho declined to accept the award on the grounds that such "bourgeois sentimentalities" were not for him[40] and that peace had not actually been achieved in Vietnam.) Kissinger donated his prize money to charity, did not attend the award ceremony and later offered to return his prize medal after the fall of South Vietnam to North Vietnamese forces 18 months later.[40]
 In 1973, Kissinger received the U.S. Senator John Heinz Award for Greatest Public Service by an Elected or Appointed Official, an award given out annually by Jefferson Awards.
 In 1976, Kissinger became the first honorary member of the Harlem Globetrotters.

 On January 13, 1977, Kissinger received the Presidential Medal of Freedom from President Gerald Ford.
 In 1980, Kissinger won the National Book Award in History for the first volume of his memoirs, The White House Years.
 In 1986, Kissinger was one of twelve recipients of the Medal of Liberty.
 In 1995, he was made an honorary Knight Commander of the Most Distinguished Order of St Michael and St George.
 In 2000, Kissinger received the Sylvanus Thayer Award at United States Military Academy at West Point.
 In 2002, Kissinger became an honorary member of the International Olympic Committee.
 On March 1, 2012, Kissinger was awarded Israel's President's Medal.
 In October 2013, Kissinger was awarded the Henry A. Grunwald Award for Public Service by Lighthouse International.
 Kissinger was a member of the Founding Council of the Rothermere American Institute, University of Oxford.
 Kissinger is a member of the following groups:
 Aspen Institute
 Atlantic Council
 Bilderberg Group
 Bohemian Club
 Council on Foreign Relations
 Center for Strategic and International Studies
World.Minds
 Kissinger served on the board of Theranos, a health technology company, from 2014 to 2017.
 He received the Theodore Roosevelt American Experience Award from the Union League Club of New York in 2009.
 He became the Honorary Chair of the advisory board for the Bloomberg New Economy Forum in 2018.
 He also received the Ellis Island Medal of Honor.

Notable works

Theses
 1950. The Meaning of History: Reflections on Spengler, Toynbee and Kant. Bachelor's honors thesis. Harvard University.
 1957. A World Restored: Metternich, Castlereagh and the Problems of Peace, 1812–22. PhD thesis, .

Memoirs
 1979. The White House Years.  (National Book Award, History Hardcover)
 1982. Years of Upheaval. 
 1999. Years of Renewal.

Public policy
 1957. Nuclear Weapons and Foreign Policy. New York: Published for the Council on Foreign Relations by Harper & Brothers. Foreword by Gordon Dean (pp. vii-x).
 1961. The Necessity for Choice: Prospects of American Foreign Policy. .
 1965. The Troubled Partnership: A Re-Appraisal of the Atlantic Alliance. Westport, Conn.: Greenwood Press. .
 1969. American Foreign Policy: Three Essays. .
 1981. For the Record: Selected Statements 1977–1980. .
 1985. Observations: Selected Speeches and Essays 1982–1984. Boston: Little, Brown. .
 1994. Diplomacy. .
 1998. Kissinger Transcripts: The Top Secret Talks With Beijing and Moscow, edited by William Burr. New York: New Press. .
 2001. Does America Need a Foreign Policy? Toward a Diplomacy for the 21st Century. .
 2002. Vietnam: A Personal History of America's Involvement in and Extrication from the Vietnam War. .
 2003. Crisis: The Anatomy of Two Major Foreign Policy Crises: Based on the Record of Henry Kissinger's Hitherto Secret Telephone Conversations. New York: Simon & Schuster. .
 2011. On China. New York: Penguin Press. .
 2014. World Order. New York: Penguin Press. .

Other works
 2021. The Age of AI: And Our Human Future. Boston: Little, Brown and Company. .
 2022. Leadership: Six Studies in World Strategy. Penguin Books Ltd. .

See also
 List of foreign-born United States Cabinet members

Explanatory notes

References

Citations

General and cited sources

Further reading

Biographies
 1973. Graubard, Stephen Richards, Kissinger: Portrait of a Mind. 
 1974. Kalb, Marvin L. and Kalb, Bernard, Kissinger, 
 1974. Schlafly, Phyllis, Kissinger on the Couch. Arlington House Publishers. 
 1983. Hersh, Seymour, The Price of Power: Kissinger in the Nixon White House, Summit Books. . (Awards: National Book Critics Circle, General Non-Fiction Award. Best Book of the Year: New York Times Book Review; Newsweek; San Francisco Chronicle)
 2004. Hanhimäki, Jussi. The Flawed Architect: Henry Kissinger and American Foreign Policy. 
 2009. Kurz, Evi. The Kissinger-Saga: Walter and Henry Kissinger, Two Brothers from Fuerth, Germany. London. Weidenfeld & Nicolson. .
 2015. 
 2020. Runciman, David, "Don't be a Kerensky!" (review of Barry Gewen, The Inevitability of Tragedy: Henry Kissinger and His World, Norton, April 2020, 452 pp.; and Thomas Schwartz, Henry Kissinger and American Power: A Political Biography, Hill and Wang, September 2020, 548 pp.), London Review of Books, vol. 42, no. 23 (December 3, 2020), pp. 13–16, 18. "[Kissinger] was ... a political opportunist doing his best to keep one step ahead of the people determined to bring him down. ... Unelected, unaccountable, never really representing anyone but himself, he rose so high and resided so long in America's political consciousness because his shapeshifting allowed people to find in him what they wanted to find." (p. 18.)

Other
 Avner, Yehuda, The Prime Ministers: An Intimate Narrative of Israeli Leadership, 2010. 
 Bass, Gary. The Blood Telegram: Nixon, Kissinger, and a Forgotten Genocide, 2013. .
 Benedetti, Amedeo. Lezioni di politica di Henry Kissinger: linguaggio, pensiero ed aforismi del più abile politico di fine Novecento, Genova: Erga, 2005 . .
 Berman, Larry, No peace, no honor. Nixon, Kissinger, and Betrayal in Vietnam, New York: Free Press, 2001. .
 Dallek, Robert, Nixon and Kissinger: Partners in Power. HarperCollins, 2007. 
 Gaddis, John Lewis. "Rescuing Choice from Circumstance: The Statecraft of Henry Kissinger". The Diplomats, 1939-1979 (Princeton UP, 1994) pp. 564–592 .
 Graebner, Norman A. "Henry Kissinger and American Foreign Policy: A Contemporary Appraisal". Conspectus of History 1.2 (1975).
 Grandin, Greg, Kissinger's Shadow: The Long Reach of America's Most Controversial Statesman. Metropolitan Books, 2015. 
 Groth, Alexander J, Henry Kissinger and the Limits of Realpolitik, Israel Journal of Foreign Affairs 5#1 (2011)
 Hanhimäki, Jussi M. Dr. Kissinger' or 'Mr. Henry'? Kissingerology, Thirty Years and Counting" Diplomatic History (2003), 27#5, pp. 637–76; historiography
 Hanhimäki, Jussi. The Flawed Architect: Henry Kissinger and American Foreign Policy (2004) 
 Hitchens, Christopher, The Trial of Henry Kissinger, 2002. 
 Keys, Barbara, "Henry Kissinger: The Emotional Statesman", Diplomatic History, 35#4, pp. 587–609, .
 Ki, Youn. "Tweaking or Breaking of the International Order: Kissinger, Shultz, and Transatlantic Relations, 1971-1973". The Korean Journal of International Studies 19.1 (2021): 1-28. 
 Klitzing, Holger, The Nemesis of Stability. Henry A. Kissinger's Ambivalent Relationship with Germany. Trier: WVT 2007, 
 Larson, Deborah Welch. "Learning in US—Soviet Relations: The Nixon-Kissinger Structure of Peace". in Learning in US and Soviet Foreign Policy (Routledge, 2019) pp. 350–399.
 Lord, Winston, and Henry Kissinger. Kissinger on Kissinger: Reflections on Diplomacy, Grand Strategy, and Leadership (All Points Books, 2019).
 Mohan, Shannon E. "Memorandum for Mr. Bundy: Henry Kissinger as Consultant to the Kennedy National Security Council", Historian, 71,2 (2009), 234–257.
 Morris, Roger, Uncertain Greatness: Henry Kissinger and American Foreign Policy. Harper and Row, 
 Rabe, Stephen G. Kissinger and Latin America: Intervention, Human Rights, and Diplomacy (2020)
 Qureshi, Lubna Z. Nixon, Kissinger, and Allende: U.S. Involvement in the 1973 Coup in Chile. Lexington Books, 2009. 
 Schulzinger, Robert D. Henry Kissinger. Doctor of Diplomacy. New York: Columbia University Press, 1989. 
 Shawcross, William, Sideshow: Kissinger, Nixon, and the Destruction of Cambodia (Revised edition October 2002) .
 Suri, Jeremi, Henry Kissinger and the American Century (Harvard, Belknap Press, 2007), .
 Thornton, Richard C. The Nixon-Kissinger Years: Reshaping America's Foreign Policy (2001)

External links

 
 
 
 Membership at the Council on Foreign Relations
 

|-

|-

 
1923 births
Living people
20th-century American male writers
20th-century American non-fiction writers
20th-century American politicians
21st-century American male writers
21st-century American non-fiction writers
21st-century American politicians
American consultants
American diplomats
American foreign policy writers
American international relations scholars
American male non-fiction writers
American memoirists
American Nobel laureates
American people of German-Jewish descent
American people of the Vietnam War
American political scientists
American political writers
Atlantic Council
Chancellors of the College of William & Mary
City College of New York alumni
Cold War diplomats
Connecticut Republicans
Consequentialists
Ford administration cabinet members
Foreign Members of the Russian Academy of Sciences
Foreign Policy Research Institute
Geopoliticians
George Washington Educational Campus alumni
Harvard College alumni
Harvard University faculty
Hudson Institute
Jewish American members of the Cabinet of the United States
Jewish American military personnel
Jewish American social scientists
Jewish American writers
Jewish emigrants from Nazi Germany to the United States
Manhattan Institute for Policy Research
Massachusetts Republicans
Member of the Academy of the Kingdom of Morocco
Members of the Steering Committee of the Bilderberg Group
Military personnel from New York City
National Book Award winners
Naturalized citizens of the United States
New York (state) Republicans
Nixon administration cabinet members
Nobel Peace Prize laureates
Operation Condor
People from Belmont, Massachusetts
People from Fürth
People from Washington Heights, Manhattan
People of the Cold War
People of the Laotian Civil War
People of the Yom Kippur War
Political realists
Presidential Medal of Freedom recipients
RAND Corporation people
Scholars of diplomacy
The Washington Institute for Near East Policy
Theranos people
Time Person of the Year
United States Army non-commissioned officers
United States Army personnel of World War II
United States National Security Advisors
United States Secretaries of State
Walsh School of Foreign Service faculty
Writers from Manhattan